The flora and fauna of Bermuda form part of a unique ecosystem due to Bermuda's isolation from the mainland of North America. The wide range of endemic species and the islands form a distinct ecoregion, the Bermuda subtropical conifer forests.

Setting
Located 900 km off the American East Coast, Bermuda is a crescent-shaped chain of 184 islands and islets that were once the rim of a volcano. The islands are slightly hilly rather than having steep cliffs, with the highest point being 79m. The coast has many bays and inlets, with sandy beaches especially on the south coasts. Bermuda has a semi-tropical climate, warmed by the Gulf Stream current. Bermuda is very densely populated. Twenty of the islands are inhabited.

Wildlife that could fly to the island or were carried there by winds and currents formed the species. There are no native mammals other than bats, and only two reptiles, but large numbers of birds, plants, and insects. Once on the island, organisms had to adapt to local conditions, such as the humid climate, lack of fresh water, frequent storms, and salt spray. The area of the islands shrank as water levels rose at the end of the Pleistocene epoch, and fewer species were able to survive in the reduced land-area. Nearly 8,000 different species of flora and fauna are known from the islands of Bermuda. The number is likely to be considerably higher if all microorganisms, cave-dwellers and deep-sea species were counted.

Today the variety of species on Bermuda has been greatly increased by introductions, both deliberate and accidental. Many of these introduced species have posed a threat to the native flora and fauna because of competition and interference with habitat.

Plants

Over 1000 species of vascular plant are found on the islands, the majority of which are introduced. Of the 165 native species, 17 are endemic.

At the time of the first human settlement by shipwrecked English sailors in 1593, Bermuda was dominated by forests of Bermuda cedar (Juniperus bermudiana) with mangrove swamps on the coast. More deliberate settlement began after 1609, and colonists began clearing forests to use for building and shipmaking, and to develop agricultural cultivation. By the 1830s, the demands of the shipbuilding industry had denuded the forests, but these recovered in many areas.

In the 1940s the cedar forests were devastated by introduced scale insects, which killed roughly 8 million trees. Replanting using resistant trees has taken place since then, but the area covered by cedar is only 10% of what it used to be. Another important component of the original forest was Bermuda palmetto (Sabal bermudana), a small palm tree. It now grows in a few small patches, notably at Paget Marsh. Other trees and shrubs include Bermuda olivewood (Cassine laneana) and Bermuda snowberry (Chiococca alba). The climate allows for the growth of other palms such as royal palm (Roystonea spp.) and coconut palm (Cocos nucifera), although the lack of very warm temperatures does not usually allow coconuts to fruit properly. Bermuda is the farthest north location in the Northern Hemisphere where coconut palms will grow naturally.

Remnant patches of mangrove swamp can be found around the coast and at some inland sites, including Hungry Bay Nature Reserve and Mangrove Lake, Bermuda. These were important for moderating the effects of storms and providing transition habitats. Here black mangrove (Avicennia germinans) and red mangrove (Rhizophora mangle) are the northernmost mangroves in the Atlantic. The inland swamps are particularly interesting as mangroves thrive in salty water; in this case, the saltwater arrives through underground channels rather than the usual tidal wash of coastal mangrove swamps. Areas of peat marsh include Devonshire, Pembroke, and Paget marshes.

Bermuda has four endemic ferns: Bermuda maidenhair fern (Adiantum bellum), Bermuda Shield Fern (Thelypteris bermudiana), Bermuda cave fern (Ctenitis sloanei) and Governor Laffan's fern (Diplazium laffanianum). The latter is extinct in the wild but is grown at Bermuda Botanical Gardens. The endemic flora of the island also include two mosses, ten lichens and forty fungi.

Among the many introduced species are the Casuarina (Casuarina equisetifolia) and Suriname cherry (Eugenia uniflora).

Endemic

Bermudiana (Sisyrinchium bermudiana)
Darrell's fleabane (Erigeron darrellianus)
Bermuda campylopus (moss) (Campylopus bermudianus)
Bermuda bean (Phaseolus lignosus)
Bermuda spike rush (Eleocharis bermudiana)
Bermuda trichostomum (moss) (Trichostomum bermudanum)
Governor Laffan's fern (Diplazium laffanianum)

Native

 Forestiera (Forestiera segregata)
 Lamarcks trema (Trema lamarckiana)
 Black mangrove (Avicennia nitida)
 White stopper (Eugenia axillaris)
 Wild coffee shrub (Psychotria undata)
 Yellow wood (Zanthoxylum flavum)

Animals

Amphibians
Bermuda has no native amphibians. A species of toad, cane toad (Rhinella marina), and two species of frog, Antilles coqui (Eleutherodactylus johnstonei), and Eleutherodactylus gossei were introduced by humans and subsequently became naturalized. R. marina and E. johnstonei are common, but E. gossei is thought to have been recently extirpated.

Reptiles
Four species of lizard and two species of turtle comprise Bermuda's non-marine reptilian fauna. Of the lizards, the Bermuda rock lizard (Plestiodon longirostris), also known as the rock lizard , is the only endemic species. Once very common, the Bermuda skink is critically endangered. The Jamaican anole (Anolis grahami) was deliberately introduced in 1905 from Jamaica and is now by far the most common lizard in Bermuda. The Leach's anole (Anolis leachii) was accidentally introduced from Antigua about 1940 and is now common. The Barbados anole (Anolis extremus) was accidentally introduced about 1940 and is rarely seen. The diamondback terrapin (Malaclemys terrapin) is native to Bermuda. The red-eared slider (Trachemys scripta elegans) was introduced as a pet, but has subsequently become invasive.

Mammals
All mammals in Bermuda are human introductions, except for four species of migratory North American bats of the genus Lasiurus: the hoary bat, eastern red bat, Seminole bat and silver-haired bat. Early accounts refer to wild or feral hogs, descendants of pigs left by the Spanish and Portuguese as feedstock for ships stopping at the islands for supplies. The house mouse, brown rat and black rat were accidentally introduced soon after the settlement of Bermuda, and feral cats have become common as another introduced species.

Birds

Over 360 species of bird have been recorded on Bermuda. The majority of these are migrants or vagrants from North America or elsewhere. Only 24 species breed; 13 of these are thought to be native.

One endemic species is the Bermuda petrel or cahow (Pterodroma cahow), which was thought to have been extinct since the 1620s. Its ground-nesting habitats had been severely disrupted by introduced species and colonists had killed the birds for food. In 1951, researchers discovered 18 breeding pairs, and started a recovery program to preserve and protect the species.

An endemic subspecies is the Bermuda white-eyed vireo or chick-of-the-village (Vireo griseus bermudianus). The national bird of Bermuda is the white-tailed tropicbird or longtail, which is a summer migrant to Bermuda, its most northerly breeding site in the world. Other native birds include the eastern bluebird, grey catbird and perhaps the common ground dove. The common moorhen is the most common native waterbird; very small numbers of American coot and pied-billed grebe are breeding. Small numbers of common tern nest around the coast. The barn owl and mourning dove colonized the island during the 20th century, and the green heron has recently begun to breed.

Of the introduced birds, the European starling, house sparrow, great kiskadee, rock dove, American crow and chicken are all very numerous and considered to be pests. Other introduced species include the mallard, northern cardinal, European goldfinch and small numbers of orange-cheeked and common waxbills. The yellow-crowned night heron was introduced in the 1970s to replace the extinct native heron.

Fossil remains of a variety of species have been found on the island, including a crane, an owl and the short-tailed albatross. Some of these became extinct as the islands' land-mass shrank by nine tenths after the Last Glacial Maximum, while others were exterminated by early settlers. The Bermuda petrel was thought to be extinct until its rediscovery in 1951.

Among the many non-breeding migrants are a variety of shorebirds, herons and ducks. In spring many shearwaters can be seen of the South Shore. Over 30 species of New World warbler are seen each year, with the yellow-rumped warbler being the most abundant. The arrival of many species is dependent on weather conditions; low-pressure systems moving across from North America often bring many birds to the islands. Among the rare visitors recorded are the Siberian flycatcher from Asia and the fork-tailed flycatcher and tropical kingbird from South America.

Insects
Lawrence Ogilvie, Bermuda's agricultural scientist 1923 to 1928 identified 395 Bermuda insects and wrote the Department of Agriculture's 52-page book The Insects of Bermuda, including Aphis Ogilviei that he discovered.

Terrestrial invertebrates

More than 1100 kinds of insects and spiders are found on Bermuda, including 41 endemic insects and a possibly endemic spider. Eighteen species of butterfly have been seen; about six of these breed on the islands, including the large monarch and the very common Bermuda buckeye (Junonia coenia bergi). More than 200 moths have been recorded; one of the most conspicuous is Pseudosphinx tetrio, which can reach  in length.

Bermuda has lost a number of its endemic invertebrates, including the Bermuda cicada (Neotibicen bermudianus), which became extinct when the cedar forests disappeared. Some species feared extinct have been rediscovered, including a Bermuda land snail (Poecilozonties circumfirmatus) and the Bermuda ant (Odontomachus insularis).

Marine life

Bermuda lies on the western edge of the Sargasso Sea, an area with high salinity, high temperature and few currents. Large quantities of seaweed of the genus Sargassum are present and there are high concentrations of plankton, but the area is less attractive to commercial fish species and seabirds.

Greater diversity is present in the coral reefs which surround the island.

A variety of whales, dolphins and porpoises have been recorded in the waters around Bermuda. The most common of these is the humpback whale, which passes the islands in April and May during its northward migration.

Threats and preservation
Bermuda was the first place in the Americas to pass conservation laws, protecting the Bermuda petrel in 1616 and the Bermuda cedar in 1622. It has a well-organised network of protected areas including Spittal Pond, marshes in Paget and Devonshire and Pembroke Parishes, Warwick Pond and the hills above Castle Harbour.

Only small areas of natural forest remain today; much was cleared since colonisation began in the 17th century, and recovered forest was lost in the 1940s due to insect infestation. The Bermuda petrel and Bermuda skink are highly endangered, and Bermuda cedar, Bermuda palmetto and Bermuda olivewood are all listed as threatened species. Some wild plants, including a spike rush, have disappeared. Introduced plants and animals have had adverse effects on the wildlife of the islands. The thriving tourist industry creates its own challenges to preserve the wildlife and habitat that attract visitors.

References

 Amos, Eric J. R. (1991) A Guide to the Birds of Bermuda, privately published.
 Bermuda Aquarium, Museum and Zoo Bermuda Biodiversity Project, downloaded 21/02/07.
 Dobson, A. (2002) A Birdwatching Guide to Bermuda, Arlequin Press, Chelmsford, UK.
 Flora of Bermuda (Illustrated) by Nathaniel Lord Britton, Ph.D., Sc.D., LL.D.  (Published 1918)
 Forbes, Keith Archibald (2007) Bermuda's Fauna, downloaded 2021-02-07.
 Gehrman, Elizabeth (2102) Rare Birds: The Extraordinary Tale of the Bermuda Petrel and the Man Who Brought It Back from Extinction (Beacon Press).
 Ogden, George (2002) Bermuda A Gardener's Guide, The Garden Club of Bermuda
 Ogilvie, Lawrence (1928)  The Insects of Bermuda
 Raine, André (2003) A Field Guide to the Birds of Bermuda, Macmillan, Oxford.

External links
Bermuda Audubon Society
Bermuda biodiversity, Flickr
Bermuda National Trust
Bermuda Government, Department of Environment and Natural Resources

Biota of archipelagoes
Environment of Bermuda

Nearctic ecoregions

Tropical and subtropical coniferous forests
Bermuda